Lev Matveevich Zelenyi (born August 23, 1948) is a Soviet and Russian physicist, an expert in the field of space plasma physics, the physics of solar-terrestrial relations, nonlinear dynamics and planetary research. Academician of the Russian Academy of Sciences (2008, Corresponding Member 2003), Doctor of Physical and Mathematical Sciences, Professor, Director of the Space Research Institute of the Russian Academy of Sciences (2002-2017), with whom his entire career is connected, now his scientific advisor. Vice-president of the Russian Academy of Sciences in 2013–2017, member of the Presidium of the Russian Academy of Sciences. Foreign member of the Bulgarian Academy of Sciences (2008), full member of the International Academy of Astronautics.

His main area of scientific activity is the physics of space plasma. He has published more than 700 scientific articles, and has about 7,000 citations of his works published after 1975.

Biography 
In 1972 he graduated from the Department of Space Studies Aerophysics and MIPT. Since 1972 he has been working in the Space Research Institute.

In 1972 he graduated from the Department of Aerophysics and Space Research of the Moscow Institute of Physics and Technology. Since the same 1972 he has been working at the Space Research Institute of the RAS. He began to study physics of space plasma under the supervision of Albert Galeev.

In January 2012 following the reentry of the Fobos-Grunt spacecraft, Zeleny proposed a repeat mission called Fobos-Grunt 2, on behalf of mission scientist Alexander Zakharov. However, with Roscosmos reaching an agreement with ESA in March 2012 to participate in the ExoMars programme, the agency opted instead to concentrate its efforts on that programme.

Bibliography

References

External links 
 Lev Zeleny's Profile at the official website of Russian Academy of Sciences 

Russian physicists
Full Members of the Russian Academy of Sciences
Foreign Members of the Bulgarian Academy of Sciences
Scientists from Moscow
1948 births
Living people
Moscow Institute of Physics and Technology alumni